The following is a list of cities and towns in Saudi Arabia.

Alphabetical list of cities and towns

References
 Central Department of Statistics and Information 
 

Saudi Arabia, List of cities and towns in

Cities